Bom Retiro, Santa Catarina is a municipality in the state of Santa Catarina in the South region of Brazil. As of the 2020 estimate, Bom Retiro had a population of 10,060.

Notable people
Dário Berger, politician

See also
List of municipalities in Santa Catarina

References

Municipalities in Santa Catarina (state)